This is a list of the National Register of Historic Places listings in Washington County, Minnesota.  It is intended to be a complete list of the properties and districts on the National Register of Historic Places in Washington County, Minnesota, United States.  The locations of National Register properties and districts for which the latitude and longitude coordinates are included below, may be seen in an online map.

There are 44 properties and districts listed on the National Register in the county, including one National Historic Landmark.  A supplementary list includes two additional sites that were formerly on the National Register.

History
Many of the historic properties are associated with the timber industry, which began just after treaties with the Dakota and Ojibwe Indians were signed in 1837.  The first sawmill in the state was established in Marine Mills (now Marine on St. Croix) in 1839.  Other towns along the St. Croix River were associated with the lumber trade: Stillwater, Lakeland, and Point Douglas.  Many of the houses in Stillwater are associated with wealthy lumbermen.  Railroads and other industries also played a part in the development of the county.

Several of these properties are listed in the "Washington County Multiple Resource Area".

Current listings

 

|}

Former listings

|}

See also
 List of National Historic Landmarks in Minnesota
 National Register of Historic Places listings in Minnesota

References

External links

 Minnesota National Register Properties Database —Minnesota Historical Society
 Historic Sites of Washington County—Washington County Historical Society

Washington County